Iddaru Pellala Muddula Police is a 1991 Telugu-language comedy film, produced by S. Venkateswara Rao and G. Chandandas under the Suchitra Creations banner and directed by Relangi Narasimha Rao. It stars Rajendra Prasad, Divyavani, Poojitha, Anusha  and music composed by J. V. Raghavulu. The film is the debut of actress Anusha in the film industry. The film was recorded as a Super Hit at the box office.  The film was later remade in Kannada as Ibbaru Hendira Muddina Police and in Tamil as Rendu Pondatti Kaavalkaaran, both versions were directed by Relangi himself.

Plot
Constable Kishtaiah (Rajendra Prasad) is an honest policeman who has two wives, Rukmini/Rukku (Divyavani) and Satyabhama/Satya (Poojitha). However, his two wives hate each other and Kishtaiah is suffering like a football between them. Actually, in the past, Kishtaiah married Rukku who thought that he was a Sub-Inspector of police, after realizing his real job, she left him alone and went back to her nucleus house. In the meantime, Satya enters his neighbor's, she fell in love with Kishtaiah and he also was attracted to her. One day they had sexual intercourse, then Satya begged Rukku to help her and Satya married Kishtaiah.

Anand (again Rajendra Prasad) a look-alike of Kishtaiah, is in love with his maternal uncle's daughter Lalitha (Anusha), his uncle Madhavaiah (Mallikarjuna Rao) decides not to give his daughter to Anand until he gets a job. So, Anand leaves the house in search of the job. Meanwhile, Kishtaiah is frequently transferred from one place to another because of his honesty and the fact that he often refuses to do his superiors' drudgery. He is fed up of the transfers, throws away his police uniform and becomes a pickpocket. Anand takes his identity and becomes a police constable. Soon, Anand must juggle between Kishtaiah's two wives, while Kishtaiah also comes back, both of them decide to manage until Anand marries Lalitha. The remaining story is a routine humorous confusion drama.

Cast
Rajendra Prasad as Constable Kishtaiah and Anand
Divyavani as Rukmini / Rukku
Poojitha as Satyabhama / Satya
Anusha as Lalitha
Suthi Velu as Gopalam / Guydala Kantham Mogudu
Mallikarjuna Rao as Madhavaiah
Krishna Chaitanya as Paatadasu
Potti Prasad as Head constable
Chidatala Appa Rao as Drunker
Sri Lakshmi as Madhavaiah's wife
Y. Vijaya as Guydala Kantham

Soundtrack

Music composed by J. V. Raghavulu. Music released on Lahari Music Company.

References

1991 films
1990s Telugu-language films
Films directed by Relangi Narasimha Rao
Films scored by J. V. Raghavulu
Indian comedy films
Telugu films remade in other languages
1991 comedy films